Suvodol is a village in the municipality of Demir Hisar, North Macedonia.

Demographics
In statistics gathered by Vasil Kanchov in 1900, the village of Suvodol was inhabited by 120 Muslim Albanians.

According to the 2002 census, the village had a total of 415 inhabitants. Ethnic groups in the village include:

Macedonians 369
Turks 13
Serbs 1
Albanians 31
Others 1

References

Villages in Demir Hisar Municipality